Greek National Road 65 is a national highway of Greece. It connects the Greek National Road 2 at Diavata, a northwestern suburb of Thessaloniki, with Kilkis. Most of the National-Road has been upgraded to a Motor-Road, connecting Thessaloniki via Kilkis with Doirani, the eastern border of Greece and North Macedonia.

The Road will be constructed as a Motor-Road, the part Nea Santa until Kilkis are ready, the second part after Kilkis will be constructed until 2014.

Gallery

References

65
Roads in Central Macedonia